Michael Rico Lang (born 8 February 1991) is a Swiss professional footballer who plays as a defender for Swiss Super League club Basel and the Switzerland national team.

Club career

St. Gallen, Grasshopper
Lang began his professional career at FC St. Gallen in the Swiss Super League. He played his first league match at age 16, making him one of the youngest debut players in the Swiss Football League. In the summer 2011 he signed a four-year contract with Grasshopper Club Zürich, the Swiss record football champion. In the 2012–13 season he won the Swiss Cup with the club in the final against FC Basel. The Grasshopper club played two years in a row the qualification for the Champions League. But they lost their games against Olympique Lyon (2013) and OSC Lille (2014).

Basel
On 1 June 2015, Lang joined Basel on a free transfer. He made his first team league debut on 19 July 2015 in the 2–0 home win against Vaduz. He scored his first goal for his new club just one week later on 25 July during the away game against his old club Grasshopper Club. It was the last goal of the game and Basel won 3–2. Under trainer Urs Fischer Lang won the Swiss Super League championship at the end of the 2015–16 Super League season and again at the end of the 2016–17 Super League season. For the club this was the eighth title in a row and their 20th championship title in total. They also won the Swiss Cup for the twelfth time, which meant they had won the double for the sixth time in the club's history.

Lang scored his first Champions League goal in the 2017–18 UEFA Champions League group stage home game on 27 September against Benfica. It was the first goal of the game that Basel won 5–0. Following this, on 22 November, in the home game against Manchester United he scored the winning goal in the 89th minute as Basel won 1–0. In the knockout phase, when playing Manchester City, Lang again scored the winning goal in the 71st minute as Basel won 2–1 and ended a 15-month unbeaten home run of their opponent.

Borussia Mönchengladbach
In June 2018, Lang joined Borussia Mönchengladbach for the 2018–19 season having agreed a four-year contract. The transfer fee paid to Basel was reported as €2.8 million.

On 29 August 2019, Lang joined SV Werder Bremen on a season-long loan deal for the 2019–20 Bundesliga season with an option to buy included.

International career

Lang made his first senior international appearance for Switzerland on 14 August 2013 in the friendly against Brazil. He came on as a second-half substitute for Stephan Lichtsteiner as the team won 1–0 at St. Jakob-Park. He scored his first goal in his second appearance later on 11 October in the 2–1 win against Albania in match 9 of 2014 FIFA World Cup qualification Group E; this win clinched Switzerland's place at the 2014 FIFA World Cup.

Lang was called by manager Ottmar Hitzfeld in the squad of 23 players for the final tournament. He played his first and only match of the campaign in the final Group E game against Honduras, entering in the final 13 minutes. Switzerland was eventually knocked out of the tournament by Argentina in the round of 16.

He was part of the squad for the  2016 European Championships where the team achieved the best result reaching round of 16. 

He was included in Switzerland's 23-man squad for the 2018 FIFA World Cup. He was sent off in Switzerland's 1–0 defeat to Sweden in the round of 16 for denying an obvious goalscoring opportunity in the 90+4th minute, becoming the only player in to tournament to be sent off in the knockout stage

In May 2019, he played in 2019 UEFA Nations League Finals, where his team finished 4th.

Career statistics

Club

International

International goals
. Switzerland score listed first, score column indicates score after each Lang goal.

Honours
Grasshopper
 Swiss Cup: 2012–13

Basel
 Swiss Super League: 2015–16, 2016–17
 Swiss Cup: 2016–17

References

External links
Profile on the Swiss Football League homepage

1991 births
Living people
Association football defenders
Swiss men's footballers
Switzerland international footballers
Switzerland youth international footballers
Swiss expatriate footballers
FC St. Gallen players
Grasshopper Club Zürich players
FC Basel players
Borussia Mönchengladbach players
SV Werder Bremen players
Swiss Super League players
Bundesliga players
2014 FIFA World Cup players
UEFA Euro 2016 players
2018 FIFA World Cup players
Expatriate footballers in Germany
People from Arbon District
Sportspeople from Thurgau